David John Gatenby (born 12 February 1952 in Launceston, Tasmania) is an Australian cricketer, who played for Tasmania. He was a right-handed batsman and leg-spin bowler who represented the team from 1972 until 1979.

Gatenby was the president of the Tasmanian Farmers and Graziers Association from 2008–2013. He is currently a member of the Heritage Council of Tasmania, and the Tasmanian Forest Practices Board.

See also
 List of Tasmanian representative cricketers

References

External links

1952 births
Living people
Australian cricketers
Canterbury cricketers
Tasmania cricketers
Cricketers from Launceston, Tasmania